The Rowing Competition at the 1993 Mediterranean Games was held in Languedoc-Roussillon, France.

Medalists

Medal table

References
1993 Mediterranean Games report at the International Committee of Mediterranean Games (CIJM) website

M
Sports at the 1993 Mediterranean Games
 
Rowing competitions in France